Jon Urbanchek (born August 23, 1936) is an American swimming coach, best known for his 22-year tenure as the head coach of the Michigan Wolverines swimming and diving team of the University of Michigan from 1982 to 2004. He has served as a coach on multiple United States national swim teams, including the U.S. Olympic swim teams in 2004 and 2008.

He is of Hungarian descent.

Early years and education
Born in Hungary. In 1957 emigrant to USA. Urbanchek attended the University of Michigan, where he was a member of the Michigan Wolverines swimming and diving team from 1959 to 1961.  He received All-American honors as a college swimmer in 1959 and 1961, and was a member of the Wolverines teams that won the 1959 and 1961 NCAA Men's Division I Swimming and Diving Championships.

After graduating from college, Urbanchek's first job was as a health teacher and aquatics coach at Garden Grove High School in 1963−64.  In the fall of 1964, he started teaching at Anaheim High School, where he coached highly successful teams in both water polo and swimming. Highlights at AHS included a third-place finish in CIF water polo in 1968 and a CIF team finals appearance in boys swimming in 1970. Also in 1964, Urbanchek co-founded the Fullerton Aquatics Sports Team (FAST Swimming) in Fullerton, California.

Urbanchek left Anaheim High School in 1978 to become the head coach at Long Beach State, where he coached the 49ers swim program for five years. In 1981, he was named Pacific Coast Athletic Association Coach of the Year. He also coached on the international level for the first time, guiding the United States to a second-place finish behind his native Hungary at the 1979 FINA Men's Water Polo World Cup.

University of Michigan Head Coach (1982−2004)

Urbanchek was responsible for the renaissance of the Michigan Men's swimming program upon entering taking over the position in 1982.  Within four years he won the Big Ten Championship and then continued to win another 9 in a row  establishing a Decade of Dominance for the program (1986-1996), during which time he won the NCAA Championship as well. In total, he won a total 13 Big Ten Championships.    Upon his retirement as Men's team head coach in 2004, he was replaced by Bob Bowman.

Post Michigan (2004− )
After retiring as Men's Head Coach at the University, Urbanchek for several years continued to coach with the club team affiliated with the school (Club Wolverine) and to assist the University's men's team as a Head of Aquatics.

Urbanchek returned to Southern California in 2010 to direct the U.S. Olympic Post-Graduate Training Center at Fullerton Aquatics (FAST Swimming). He coached two swimmers to gold medals at the 2012 Olympics (Tyler Clary and Matt McLean) and served as special assistant coach for the 2012 U.S. Olympic Swimming Team.

Urbanchek was inducted into the International Swimming Hall of Fame (ISHOF) in 2008.

Urbanchek was inducted into the Michigan Sports Hall of Fame in 2009

In December 2019, the newly-rebuilt pool at Anaheim High School was officially opened in his honor as the Jon Urbanchek Aquatics Complex.

See also
 List of members of the International Swimming Hall of Fame

References

Michigan Wolverines men's swimmers
American swimming coaches
American people of Hungarian descent
Michigan Wolverines swimming coaches
American diving coaches
College diving coaches in the United States
Living people
1936 births